The National Association of Municipalities (Føroya Kommunufelag) is the original municipal organisation of the Faroe Islands. All Faroese municipalities except those in Kommunusamskipan Føroya are members of Føroya Kommunufelag. Føroya Kommunfelag also hosts the municipal environmental bureau, Agendaskrivstovan.

See also
List of micro-regional organizations

External links
Official website

Local government organizations